Constantine Manasses (c. 1130 - c. 1187) was a Byzantine chronicler who flourished in the 12th century during the reign of Manuel I Komnenos (1143-1180). He was the author of a chronicle or historical synopsis of events from the creation of the world to the end of the reign of Nikephoros Botaneiates (1081), sponsored by Irene Komnene, the emperor's sister-in-law. It consists of about 7000 lines in political verse. It obtained great popularity and appeared in a free prose translation; it was also translated into Bulgarian in the 14th century.

In 1969 Bulgaria issued two sets of stamps depicting important scenes of the chronicle, to celebrate it.

Manasses also wrote the poetical romance Loves of Aristander and Callithea, also in political verse. It is only known from the fragments preserved in the rose-garden of Macarius Chrysocephalus (14th century). Manasses also wrote a short biography of Oppian, and some descriptive pieces (all except one unpublished) on artistic and other subjects.

References 

12th-century births
1180s deaths
Byzantine chroniclers
12th-century Byzantine historians
12th-century Greek painters
Writers from Constantinople